The Convair Model 58-9 was a proposed American supersonic transport, developed by the Convair division of General Dynamics and intended to carry fifty-two passengers at over Mach 2. Derived from the B-58 Hustler bomber, it was designed in 1961 but no examples of the type were ever built.

Design and development
The Model 58-9 was Convair's proposal for the third step in a three-step program for the development of a SST based on the company's B-58 Hustler supersonic medium bomber. Derived from the proposed B-58C, an enlarged version of the Hustler, the Model 58-9 was anticipated to follow up on route-proving using an unmodified B-58, with a version of the bomber using a five-passenger version of its unique external weapons pod being an intermediate step to the final airliner version.

Proposed during early 1961, the Model 58-9 would use the wing design of the B-58C, which would be mated to an entirely new fuselage and tail; the airliner's cabin would be capable of seating as many as 52 passengers. If the project had been approved, it was projected by Convair that the first prototype of the airliner could fly within three years of the project being approved, with eighteen months of flight testing, using four prototype aircraft, following the aircraft's maiden flight. It was expected that the Military Air Transport Service would perform simulated airline flights using the Model 58-9 during its development.

See also

References

External links

 Convair Model 58-9 SST

Abandoned civil aircraft projects of the United States
58-9
Supersonic transports
Quadjets
Mid-wing aircraft